Ivan Rantchev (born 21 March 1990, in Sofia) is a Bulgarian snowboarder. He placed 26th in the men's parallel giant slalom event at the 2010 Winter Olympics.

References

1990 births
Living people
Sportspeople from Sofia
Bulgarian male snowboarders
Olympic snowboarders of Bulgaria
Snowboarders at the 2010 Winter Olympics